The 206th (Canadien-Francais) Battalion, CEF was a unit in the Canadian Expeditionary Force during the First World War.

Based in Montreal, Quebec, the unit began recruiting during the winter of 1915/16 in the counties of Beauharnois, La Prairie, and Terrebonne.

The battalion was absorbed into the 167th Battalion, CEF on August 17, 1916, while still in Canada.  The 206th (Canadien-Francais) Battalion, CEF had one Officer Commanding: Lieut-Col. T. Pagnuelo.

The 206th Battalion is perpetuated by Le Régiment de Maisonneuve.

References

Meek, John F. Over the Top! The Canadian Infantry in the First World War. Orangeville, Ont.: The Author, 1971.

Battalions of the Canadian Expeditionary Force